Minuscule 625 (in the Gregory-Aland numbering), α 159 (von Soden), is a Greek minuscule manuscript of the New Testament, on parchment. Palaeographically it has been assigned to the 12th century. The manuscript has complex contents. Tischendorf labelled it by 158a and 192p.

Description 

The codex contains the text of the Acts, Catholic epistles, and Pauline epistles on 481 parchment leaves (size ), it has not any lacunae. The text is written in one column per page, 21 lines per page.

Lectionary markings and incipits were added by a later hand.

The leaf 481 with the ending of Hebrews was supplied in the 16th century.

The order of books: Acts, Catholic epistles, and Pauline epistles. The Epistle to the Hebrews is placed after Epistle to Philemon.

Text 

The Greek text of the codex is a representative of the Byzantine text-type. Aland placed it in Category V.

History 

The manuscript was added to the list of New Testament manuscripts by Johann Martin Augustin Scholz. From this copy Angelo Mai supplied the lacunae of Codex Vaticanus in the Pauline epistles. Gregory saw the manuscript in 1886.

Formerly it was labelled by 158a and 192p. In 1908 Gregory gave the number 625 to it.

The manuscript currently is housed at the Vatican Library (Vat. gr. 1761), at Rome.

See also 

 List of New Testament minuscules
 Biblical manuscript
 Textual criticism

References

Further reading 

 

Greek New Testament minuscules
12th-century biblical manuscripts
Manuscripts of the Vatican Library